The Symphony No. 39 in E major of Wolfgang Amadeus Mozart, K. 543, was completed on 26 June 1788.

Composition

The Symphony No. 39 is the first of a set of three (his last symphonies) that Mozart composed in rapid succession during the summer of 1788. No. 40 was completed on 25 July and No. 41 on 10 August. Nikolaus Harnoncourt argues that Mozart composed the three symphonies as a unified work, pointing, among other things, to the fact that the Symphony No. 39 has a grand introduction (in the manner of an overture) but no coda.

Around the time that he composed the three symphonies, Mozart was writing his piano trios in E major and C major (K. 542 and K. 548), his sonata facile (K. 545), and a violin sonatina (K. 547). Mozart biographer Alfred Einstein has suggested that Mozart took Michael Haydn's Symphony No. 26, in the same key, as a model.

Premiere 
It seems to be impossible to determine the date of the premiere of the 39th Symphony on the basis of currently available evidence; in fact, it cannot be established whether the symphony was ever performed in the composer's lifetime. Mozart even sent a pair of tickets for this series to his friend Michael von Puchberg. But it seems impossible to determine whether the concert series was held or was cancelled for lack of interest. In addition, in the period up to the end of his life, Mozart participated in various other concerts the programs of which included an unidentified symphony; these also could have been the occasion of the premiere of the 39th (for details, see Symphony No. 40 (Mozart)).

First eyewitness account

However, we now have what is likely the first known eyewitness account of the performance of the 39th Symphony. An all-Mozart memorial concert took place in Hamburg in March 1792, where the verified performance of this symphony was noted by an eyewitness named Iwan Anderwitsch, who describes the start of the symphony as follows:

In modern times, the work is part of the core symphonic repertoire and is frequently performed and recorded.

Instrumentation and movements
The symphony is scored for flute, two clarinets, two bassoons, two horns, two trumpets, timpani and strings.

There are four movements:

I. Adagio – Allegro

The first movement opens with a majestic introduction with fanfares heard in the brass section. This is followed by an Allegro in sonata form, though while several features – the loud outburst following the soft opening, for instance – connect it with the galant school that influences the earliest of his symphonies. The independence of the winds and greater interplay of the parts in general, and the fact that the second theme group contains several themes (including a particularly felicitous "walking theme") compared to those earlier symphonies whose second groups were practically always completely trivial, are just a very few of the points that distinguish this movement from those earlier works, from which it has more differences than similarities.

II. Andante con moto

The slow movement, in abridged sonata form, i.e. no development section, starts quietly in the strings and expands into the rest of the orchestra. Quiet main material and energetic, somewhat agitated transitions characterize this movement. The key is A major, the subdominant of E major.

III. Menuetto (Allegretto) 

The work has a very interesting minuet and trio. The trio is an Austrian folk dance called a "Ländler" and features a clarinet solo. The forceful Menuetto is set off by the trio's unusual tint of the second clarinet playing arpeggios in its low (chalumeau) register. The melody for this particular folk dance derived from local drinking songs which were popular in Vienna during the late 18th century.

IV. Allegro

The finale is another sonata form whose main theme, like that of the later string quintet in D, is mostly a scale, here ascending and descending. The development section is dramatic; there is no coda, but both the exposition, and the development through the end of the recapitulation, are requested to be, and often are, repeated.

References

Notes

Sources

External links

Michael Lorenz, "Mozart's Apartment on the Alsergrund", apartment where Mozart wrote his last three symphonies

39
1788 compositions
Compositions in E-flat major